Love Revolution is a South Korean streaming television series starring Park Ji-hoon, Lee Ruby, Kim Young-hoon, Jung Da-eun, Im Da-young, Ko Chan-bin and Ahn Do-gyu. Based from the popular Naver webtoon of the same name, it aired on KakaoTV and Naver series on every Thursday and Sunday for 30 episodes, starting from September 1 to December 27, 2020.

It is also available exclusively with multi-languages subtitles on iQIYI in South East Asia, Taiwan, Hong Kong, and Macau, streaming the same time in South Korea and on Viki for other countries.

Synopsis 
17-year-old Gong Joo-young (Park Ji-hoon), a cute and lovable high school student, falls deeply in love at first sight with the pretty but standoffish Wang Ja-rim (Lee Ruby). Thinking they are destined for each other, Joo-young perseveres in winning her heart, while Ja-rim is almost always annoyed with his gaudy displays of affection.

Cast

Main cast 
 Park Ji-hoon as Gong Joo-young 
 a student of Class 1-2 in Isam Information High School; Ja-rim's boyfriend. An outgoing and jolly boy, Joo-young falls in love deeply with Ja-rim at first sight, and he fancifully surmises that he and Ja-rim are destined to be together on the premise of the many trivial circumstances surrounding them. Through his sincere, albeit gaudy, displays of affection, he perseveres in winning Ja-rim's heart despite her apparent coldness towards him.
 Lee Ruby as Wang Ja-rim
 a student of Class 1-3 in Isam Information High School; Joo-young's girlfriend. In contrast to Joo-young, Ja-rim has a reticent and standoffish personality; she is also pretty and is popular among her peers. She is annoyed by Joo-young's advances though she never hates him. After weeks of ignoring Joo-young, she finally accepts him as her boyfriend. She insists to Joo-young to not be noisy, showy and intimately close with her, though her temperament towards him slowly softens as time passes.
 Kim Young-hoon as Lee Kyung-woo
 a student of Class 1-3 in Isam Information High School; Joo-young's best friend. A popular student among their peers, Kyung-woo has long bangs that covers his left eye. He jokes around and is friendly despite his cold and sharp appearance. He later harbors feelings for Ja-rim but, for Joo-young's sake, he hides it and goes out instead with Ye-seul.
 Jung Da-eun as Yang Min-ji
 a student of Class 1-3 in Isam Information High School; Ja-rim's best friend. Min-ji secretly helps Joo-young win Ja-rim's heart. She harbors feelings towards Kyung-woo.
 Im Da-young as Oh Ah-ram
 a student of Class 1-3 in Isam Information High School; Ja-rim's best friend. Despite her love for food, Ah-ram is athletic and is skilled at fighting.
 Ko Chan-bin as Kim Byung-hoon
 a student of Class 1-2 in Isam Information High School; Joo-young's close friend. Byung-hoon has a cheerful personality and is the mood-maker among their friends.
 Ahn Do-gyu as Ahn Kyung-min
 a student of Class 1-3 in Isam Information High School; Joo-young's close friend. Kyung-min is a bespectacled boy and also tends to joke around.

Supporting cast 

 Kim Seung-hee as Hong Jin-hee
 a student of Class 1-3 in Isam Information High School; Ja-rim's close friend.
 Kim Dong-hyun as Dokgo Moon
 Dean of Isam Information High School; homeroom teacher of Class 1-2.
 Kim Joong-don as Cho Yeon-sa
 homeroom teacher of Class 1-3 in Isam Information High School.
 Kim Su-gyeom as Namgoong Ji-soo
 Ah-ram's junior athlete at the fitness center. Ji-soo has a crush on Ah-ram.
 Lee Seo-yeon as Wang Byeol-lim
 Ja-rim's younger sister
 Lee Se-hee as Jang Hae-ri
 a senior student at Isam Information High School who attempts to seduce Joo-young away from Ja-rim
 Kwak Hee-joo as Jung Sang-hoon
 Joo-young and Kyung-woo's middle school acquaintance. Sang-hoon has a crush on Min-ji.
 Nam Kyu-hee as Bang Ye-seul
 a student in Isam Information High School; Kyung-woo's former girlfriend. Ye-seul has a crush on Kyung-woo and she became his girlfriend unknowing of his true feelings. She breaks up with Kyung-woo when she realizes he does not truly love her.
 Kim Young-jae as Choi Jung-woo
 a worker in a gaming shop. Jung-woo courted Ja-rim when she was in middle school.

Special appearance 
 Yoo Byung-jae as Yang Ho
 school nurse in Isam Information High School
 Park Chae-rin as Nam Yu-ri
 Kyung-woo's former girlfriend in middle school.
 Choi Su-rin as Kyung-woo's mother

Episodes 
The following table contains the episodes of the series:

Original soundtrack

Part 1

Part 2

Part 3

Part 4

Part 5

International broadcast
The series is available on iQIYI with multi-languages subtitles in South East Asia and Taiwan.

Notes

References

External links 
 
  
 
 Love Revolution on Viki
 Love Revolution at Naver Webtoon (in Korean)

KakaoTV original programming
South Korean drama web series
2020 web series debuts
Television shows based on South Korean webtoons
2020 web series endings